Phil Harrison is the vice president of general manager of Google, formerly of Microsoft and Sony Computer Entertainment.

Phil, Philip or Phillip Harrison may also refer to:

 Phil Harrison (footballer) (born 1961), Australian rules footballer
 Phil Harrison (musician), former keyboard player in the band The Korgis
 Phil Harrison (pool player), English pool player
 Philip Harrison (cricketer) (1885–1964), English cricketer

See also 
 Phil Harris (disambiguation)